Alphacoronaviruses (Alpha-CoV) are members of the first of the four genera (Alpha-, Beta-, Gamma-, and Delta-) of coronaviruses. They are positive-sense, single-stranded RNA viruses that infect mammals, including humans. They have spherical virions with club-shaped surface projections formed by trimers of the spike protein, and a viral envelope.

Alphacoronaviruses are in the subfamily Orthocoronavirinae of the family Coronaviridae. Both the Alpha- and Betacoronavirus lineages descend from the bat viral gene pool. Alphacoronaviruses were previously known as "phylogroup 1 coronaviruses".

The Alphacoronavirus genus is very diverse, particularly in bats. Most bat originating strains haven't been successfully isolated and cultured in laboratory. Alphacoronaviruses infecting other mammal species have been much better studied, see List of Coronavirus live isolates.

Etymology 
The name alphacoronavirus is derived from Ancient Greek ἄλφα (álpha, "the first letter of the Greek alphabet"), and κορώνη (korṓnē, "garland, wreath"), meaning crown, which describes the appearance of the surface projections seen under electron microscopy that resemble a solar corona.

Structure
The virion is enveloped and spherical measuring 120–160 nm in diameter and a core shell of about 65 nm. Glycoproteins and trimers form large surface projections which create the appearance of solar corona. This genus, like other coronaviruses, has a spike protein with a type I fusion machine (S2) and a receptor-binding domain (S1). It assembles into a trimer. Unlike beta- and gammacoronaviruses, this protein is not cleaved into two halves.

Genome 

The genome is positive-sense, single-stranded RNA with a length of 27 to 29 kilobases and a 3'-polyA tail. Two large, overlapping ORFs at the 5'-end of the genome encode the major non-structural proteins expressed as a fusion protein by ribosomal frameshift. These include regions with protease, helicase and RNA polymerase motifs. There are seven other genes downstream which encode structural proteins. These are expressed from a 3'-coterminal nested set of subgenomic mRNAs.

Recombination
Both types of Alphacoronavirus 1, feline coronavirus (FCoV) and canine coronavirus (CCoV), are known to exist in two serotypes. Serotype II targets Aminopeptidase N, while the receptor for Serotype I is unknown. The difference is due to a different spike protein. There is a common ancestor for FCoV and CCoV. This ancestor gradually evolved into FCoV I and CCoV I. An S protein from an unknown virus was recombined into the ancestor and gave rise to CCoV II. CCoV II once again recombined with FCoV to create FCoV II. CCoV II gradually evolved into TGEV. A spike deletion in TGEV creates PRCV. All these viruses are sorted into the subgenus Tegacovirus.

Classification

The following subgenera and species are recognized:

Colacovirus
Bat coronavirus CDPHE15
Decacovirus
Bat coronavirus HKU10
Rhinolophus ferrumequinum alphacoronavirus HuB-2013
Duvinacovirus
Human coronavirus 229E
Luchacovirus
Lucheng Rn rat coronavirus
Minacovirus
Mink coronavirus 1
Ferret coronavirus
Minunacovirus
Miniopterus bat coronavirus 1
Miniopterus bat coronavirus HKU8
Myotacovirus
Myotis ricketti alphacoronavirus Sax-2011
Nyctacovirus
Nyctalus velutinus alphacoronavirus SC-2013
Pipistrellus kuhlii coronavirus 3398
Pedacovirus
Porcine epidemic diarrhea virus
Scotophilus bat coronavirus 512
Rhinacovirus
Rhinolophus bat coronavirus HKU2
Setracovirus
Human coronavirus NL63
NL63-related bat coronavirus strain BtKYNL63-9b
Soracovirus
Sorex araneus coronavirus T14
Sunacovirus
Suncus murinus coronavirus X74
Tegacovirus
Alphacoronavirus 1
 Canine coronavirus
 Feline coronavirus
 Human CCoV-HuPn-2018
 Porcine transmissible gastroenteritis coronavirus

See also
Betacoronavirus
Coronavirus
RNA virus

References

External links
http://viralzone.expasy.org/all_by_protein/766.html

 
Virus genera
Coronaviruses